Wulan is a 2006–2007 Indonesian soap opera starring Dhini Aminarti, Giovanni L. Tobing, Alice Norin, Asmirandah, Rio Reifan, Chacha Frederica, Shireen Sungkar, Uci Bing Slamet, Hengky Solaiman, Rima Melati, Nanny Somanegara, Yadi Timo and Ana C. Pinem. It was written by Kitta Utara, directed by Noto Bagaskoro, and produced by SinemArt Production. The show aired for 146 episodes between 2006 and 2007.

Cast
 Dhini Aminarti as Wulan
 Giovanni Yosafat Tobing as Budi
 Alice Norin as Aline
 Asmirandah as Baby
 Rio Reifan as Nugroho
 Chacha Frederica as Dona
 Shireen Sungkar as Shinta
 Aditya Herpavi as Awan
 Lia Kartika as Ana
 Kinaryosih as Grace
 Uci Bing Slamet as Asih
 Nani Somanegara as Tati
 Rima Melati as Dira
 Yadi Timo as Mr. Jayadi
 Henky Solaiman as Mr. Wahyu
 Ana Pinem as Mrs. Jayadi
 Umay Shahab as Pandu
 Bulan Ayu as Arini
 Hanny Wahab as Maya
 Handika Pratama as Bagus
 Sandy Tumiwa as Danar

Broadcast history
The show aired on RCTI from October 30, 2006 to May 18, 2007 on Mondays to Fridays at 21:00-22:00 WIB, 22:00-23:00 WITA, and 23:00-00:00 WIT for 146 episodes.

Controversy
Wulan has been accused of plagiarising Korean drama Yellow Handkerchief.

References

External links
  Review on RCTI
  Wulan Plot From SinemArt

2006 Indonesian television series debuts
2007 Indonesian television series endings
Indonesian television series
Indonesian television soap operas
RCTI original programming